Johannes Enschedé (10 July 1708 in Haarlem – 21 October 1780 in Haarlem) was a Dutch printer, owner of Royal Joh. Enschedé and collector.

Enschedé belonged to the family that owned the company currently known as Royal Joh. Enschedé (founded by Izaak Enschedé) and owned the company.

On 23 December 1736 he married Helena Hoefnagel (Haarlem 12 December 1714 – Haarlem 20 July 1781) daughter of Adriaan Hoefnagel and Sara Brinckhorst. Johannes had three sons, which joined him in the printing business: Johannes, Jacobus and Abraham. Johannes Enschedé collected old books, and was one of the people who tried to defend the opinion that the Haarlem book printer Coster was the original inventor of the bookprinting. He was member of Teylers Tweede Genootschap (Teylers Second or Scientific Society) from the founding in 1778 until his death.

References and footnotes 

Members of Teylers Tweede Genootschap
People from Haarlem
1708 births
1780 deaths
Joh. Enschedé
18th-century Dutch businesspeople